Lloyd Fairbrother (born 13 November 1991, Torpoint) is a Welsh rugby union player. His position is prop forward.

Fairbrother played for Moseley, Cornish Pirates and Plymouth Albion. In May 2014 he transferred from Exeter Chiefs to the Dragons.

Fairbrother qualifies to play internationally for Wales as his mother was born in Blaenavon.

References

External links
Dragons profile

1991 births
Living people
People from Torpoint
Dragons RFC players
English rugby union players
Rugby union players from Cornwall
Rugby union props
Cornish Pirates players
Exeter Chiefs players
Plymouth Albion R.F.C. players